Anjam may refer to:

Anjam language
Kenar Anjam
Anjam Choudry